The discography of Colombian recording artist Sebastián Yatra consists of two studio albums, one extended play, one mixtape, fifty-seven singles (including five as a featured artist) and eight promotional singles.

Albums

Studio albums

Mixtapes

Extended plays

Singles

As lead artist

Notes
 Note 1: Uses combined chart entries for "No Hay Nadie Más" and "No Hay Nadie Más (My Only One)"

As featured artist

Promotional singles

Notes

References

Sebastián Yatra
Discographies of Colombian artists
Latin pop music discographies